Ẽfini Hiroshima Soccer Club was a Japanese football club based in Hiroshima. The club has played in Japan Soccer League Division 2.

Club name
?–1992 : Mazda Auto Hiroshima SC
1992–1996 : Ẽfini Hiroshima SC

External links
Football of Japan 

Japan Soccer League clubs
1996 disestablishments in Japan
Defunct football clubs in Japan
Sports teams in Hiroshima
Association football clubs disestablished in 1996
Mazda
Works association football clubs in Japan